The local conference of bishops is the Episcopal Conference of Equatorial Guinea (Spanish: Conferencia Episcopal de Guinea Ecuatorial, CEGE).

The ECEG is a member of the Association des Conférences Episcopal de la Région de l'Afrique Central (ACERAC) and Symposium of Episcopal Conferences of Africa and Madagascar (SECAM).

List of presidents of the Bishops' Conference:

1983-1991: Rafael María Nze Abuy, Archbishop of Malabo

1992-2000: Anacleto Sima Ngua, Bishop of Bata

2000 - ...: Ildefonso Obama Obono, Archbishop of Malabo

References

External links
 http://www.gcatholic.org/dioceses/country/GQ.htm
 http://www.catholic-hierarchy.org/country/gq.html 

Equatorial
Catholic Church in Equatorial Guinea

it:Chiesa cattolica in Guinea Equatoriale#Conferenza_episcopale